Leigh Matthew Willison (born 14 October 1969) is a former Australian rules football player.

Playing career
Willison played three matches for  during the 1993 AFL season. Between 1995 and 2002 he played 122 WAFL matches for the Sharks, including the 1998 premiership-winning Sharks team.

In 1998 Willison played one match for Western Australia against South Australia.

References

1969 births
Geelong Football Club players
East Perth Football Club players
East Fremantle Football Club players
Living people
Australian rules footballers from Western Australia